Hawley Lake is an American  lake and place in east-central Arizona, in the White Mountain Apache Indian Reservation, and has an elevation of .

The lake is a remnant of Pliocene volcanism on the Mogollon Rim but it has been artificially extended as a reservoir for downstream irrigation plus trout and ice fishing (though an $9 tribal licence is required to fish on the reservation). The camphost Bill Kee has been part of this recreation facility for nearly 25 years. Its popularity as a recreational area is enhanced by a nearby ski resort.

Climate
Owing to its high elevation, Hawley Lake has a humid continental climate (Köppen Dsb) and stands as one of the coldest and wettest places in Arizona. Rainfall from July to September is also high, though not exceptional compared to many parts of southeastern Arizona. Hawley Lake holds the all-time record low temperature in Arizona history with −40 °F/°C recorded on January 7, 1971.

Gallery

References

Lakes of Arizona
Lakes of Apache County, Arizona